was a town located in Awa District, Chiba Prefecture, Japan.

Amatsukominato was formed on February 11, 1955, by the merger of the towns of Amatsu and Kominato.

On February 11, 2005, Amatsukominato was merged into the expanded city of Kamogawa, and thus no longer exists as an independent municipality.

In 2003 (the last data available before its merger into Kamogawa), the town had an estimated population of 7,294 and a density of 166 persons per km². Its total area was 43.95 km².

The town's economy was largely based on commercial fishing.

External links
Kamogawa City Website 

Dissolved municipalities of Chiba Prefecture
Kamogawa, Chiba